

References
  (D-glutamic acid)
  (L-glutamic acid)

Chemical data pages
Chemical data pages cleanup